Damayanti Joshi (5 September 1928 – 19 September 2004) was a noted renowned exponent of the Kathak dance form.She believed Kathak is the art of storytelling. She began in the 1930s dancing in Madame Menaka's troupe, which travelled to many parts of the world. She learnt Kathak from Sitaram Prasad of Jaipur Gharana and became an adept dancer at a very young age, and later trained under from Acchan Maharaj, Lacchu Maharaj and Shambhu Maharaj of Lucknow gharana, thus imbibing nuances from both the traditions. She became independent in the 1950s and achieved prominence in the 1960s, before turning into a guru at her dance school in Mumbai.

She received the Padma Shri in 1970, the Sangeet Natak Akademi Award for Dance in 1968, and had remained Director of the U.P. Kathak Kendra in Lucknow.

Early life and training
Born in a Hindu family in Mumbai in 1928, she grew up in the household of General Dr Sahib Singh Sokhey and his wife Leila Sokhey (born Roy) who became known as Madame Menaka. Manaka had lost her own child and she had decided to adopt Joshi. Joshi's mother Vatsala Joshi would not give up her daughter and they agreed to be joint guardians. Initially performed in temples. In Manaka's troupe she learnt about Kathak from Pandit Sitaram Prasad as she toured in Menaka's troupe. After ten years, when she was 15 she had performed in European major cities. The Sokheys employed Damayanti's mother and Joshi received an education. Among her contemporaries at Madame Menaka's was Shirin Vajifdar, a pioneering classical dancer from the Parsi community.

She was the first student at Mumbai's Sri Rajarajeswari Bharata Natya Kala Mandir, where she learned Bharat Natyam from Guru T. K. Mahalingam Pillai, doyen among nattuvanars.

Career
After the mid-1950s, Damayanti established herself as a successful solo Kathak dancer, taking training from Pandits, Achhan Maharaj, Lachhu Maharaj and Shambhu Maharaj of the Lucknow gharana and Guru Hiralal of the Jaipur gharana. Particularly, at Kathak Kendra, Delhi, she trained under Shambhu Maharaj. She was the first person to introduce "Saree" as a costume in Kathak dance.

She also taught Kathak at Indira Kala Vishvaidyalaya, Khairagarh, and Kathak Kendra in Lucknow. She has been honoured with the Sangeet Natak Akademi Award (1968) and the Padma Shri (1970). She was also the guru to Bireshwar Gautam.

She has been featured in the documentary on Kathak in 1971 by Films Division,  Government of India, and another film entitled "Damayanti Joshi" directed by Hukumat Sarin was made in 1973.

Damayanti Joshi died in Mumbai at her home on Sunday, September 19, 2004. She had been ailing and was bed-ridden for almost one year after she suffered a stroke attack.

In the passing away of this great dancer we lost a great wealth of knowledge which we can only hope was imparted to her students like Pt. Bireshwar Gautam who remained a faithful student, dedicated to her till her very end.

Works
 Madame Menaka, by Damayanti Joshi. Sangeet Natak Akademi, 1989.
 ''Rediscovering India, Indian philosophy library: Kathak dance through ages, by Projesh Banerji, Damayanti Joshi. Cosmo publications, 1990.

See also
List of Kathak dancers

References

External links
 

Performers of Indian classical dance
Kathak exponents
1928 births
2004 deaths
Artists from Mumbai
Teachers of Indian classical dance
Recipients of the Sangeet Natak Akademi Award
Recipients of the Padma Shri in arts
Women educators from Maharashtra
Indian dance teachers
Indian female classical dancers
Dancers from Maharashtra
20th-century Indian dancers
20th-century Indian women artists
Women artists from Maharashtra
Educators from Maharashtra
20th-century Indian educators
20th-century women educators